Anna Jenny Charlotte Perrelli (born 7 October 1974) is a Swedish singer and television host. She was the winner of the 1999 Melodifestivalen and subsequently that year's Eurovision Song Contest with the song "Take Me to Your Heaven".

Since then she has released seven albums and multiple singles. Perrelli once again won Melodifestivalen 2008 and represented Sweden in the Eurovision Song Contest 2008 with her song "Hero".

She is one of Sweden's most popular female singers, often performing at Sweden's top shows. Throughout her career, she has worked with different types of music, ranging from dansband and schlager, via modern pop, to soulful ballads and jazz melodies.

Biography

1987–1998
Born in Hovmantorp, in the southern Swedish province Småland, at the age of thirteen Perrelli joined a local dansband, Bengt Ingvars, which became "Bengt Ingvars med Charlotte". After finishing her compulsory school education, Perrelli moved from Hovmantorp to the neighbouring town of Växjö where she attended the High School of Performing Arts. She also became the lead singer of a band named Kendix.

In 1994, Perrelli started singing with the well-established dansband Anders Engbergs. After two albums, Perrelli left them and joined the highly successful Wizex in 1997. Larger venues and professional management increased the band's reputation. In 1998, the band was nominated for a Swedish Grammis (Grammy) for the album Mot nya mål, and the album Tusen och en natt that went gold.

From 1997 to 1998 Perrelli starred as the instructor Millan Svensson in the Swedish soap opera Vita lögner.

1999–2000

After winning that year's national Melodifestivalen, Perrelli went to Jerusalem to compete as the Swedish representative for the 1999 Eurovision Song Contest on 29 May with her song "Take Me to Your Heaven". She won the contest with 163 points, making her the fourth Swedish representative to win the competition since Carola Häggkvist's victory in 1991, the Herreys brothers' in 1984 and ABBA's in 1974.

Following her Eurovision success, she toured Europe and the Middle East, promoting her winning song. She also started working on her first solo album, Charlotte. Later that year, Perrelli was voted Sweden's sexiest woman by the magazine Café. She later released "I Write You a Lovesong", together with debut album Charlotte, which was well received.

She did not appear at the Eurovision Song Contest 2000 due to a conflict between her and Sveriges Television.

2001–2003
In 2001 she released her second album, Miss Jealousy, a pop/rock album which included the top-20 hit single "You Got Me Going Crazy", written by Mårten Sandén, Johan Åberg and Paul Rein as well as the radio hit "Light of My Life". Following the release, she promoted the album throughout Europe and New Zealand.

Perrelli hosted the first semi-final of Melodifestivalen 2003 with Mark Levengood and Lena Philipsson. In April 2003 she performed in Jesus Christ Superstar in Stockholm. In September she released a new single, "Broken Heart", which was followed up by the album Gone Too Long in June 2004. The album contained songs such as "Gone Too Long", "Flashdance" and "Million Miles Away".

2004–2007
After the success in Melodifestivalen 2003, Perrelli was once again asked to host Melodifestivalen 2004. Perrelli, Peter Settman and Ola Lindholm ended up hosting the entire tour together. After the festival, Swedish TV4 offered her own show on the channel, Super Troupers, a talent-show for kids.

In mid-2004 she released her, until then, most successful album, Gone Too Long, which included songs by some of Sweden's top producers, including Jörgen Elofsson. The album topped the Swedish top for weeks and contained hits such as "A Million Miles Away" and "Gone Too Long". In the summer, she joined Robert Wells, Jill Johnson and others on the Rhapsody in Rock-tour in mid-2004. In the spring of 2005, she was a judge on Inför Eurovision, a TV show which previewed that year's Eurovision songs.

In 2006, she released the album I din röst, in honour of the famous jazz singer Monica Zetterlund, which covered Zetterlund's most famous songs, along with some personal favorites and the soul ballad "I din röst", the title song written by Perrelli for the album. The album was successful, and she performed many of the songs in Sweden's top shows such as Allsång på Skansen and Nationaldagen. She also co-hosted the TV show Tillsammans för världens barn in October, where she also performed "The Greatest Love of All".

In May 2007 Perrelli was the Swedish expert in the Nordic preview show panel discussion about the Eurovision Song Contest. In mid-2007 Perrelli toured Sweden with Diggiloo. She was joined by singers such as Linda Bengtzing, Lasse Holm, Molly Sandén, Lotta Engberg and Jan Johansen. During the summer she released the love ballad "Som du" which she performed at the popular show Sommarkrysset. During the autumn she released the single disco song "Jag är tillbaks" which she performed at the show Babban & Co.

2008–2009

On 15 March 2008, Perrelli performed at the Stockholm Globe Arena and won Melodifestivalen 2008 again with her song "Hero", which topped the charts in Sweden for several weeks and became the most sold single of 2008 for a Swedish artist. She went on to represent Sweden in the Eurovision Song Contest 2008 in Belgrade, Serbia, where she advanced to the finals. Preparing for Eurovision, she went out on a big tour, performing at popular TV shows in 17 nations, in order to promote the song.

On 14 April, Perrelli filmed the music video for "Hero" on location in Stockholm. She also released her album titled Hero, which went on to go platinum in Sweden. Despite being one of the favourites to win Eurovision, it finished 18th out of 25 entries in the final, with 47 points in total. The song "Bullet" was subsequently released as a single, performing moderately on the Swedish charts.

Perrelli started rehearsals for Rhapsody in Rock along with Wells, with whom she toured with during that summer. Perrelli and Wells performed a concert in Beijing, China during the 2008 Summer Olympics. In August, it was revealed that Perrelli had signed a record deal with a Chinese record label; as a result, her album Hero was released in China.

During the autumn, she worked on her Christmas album Rimfrostjul, which was released in November 2008. She also performed on several of Sweden's top TV shows, such as Sommarkrysset, Victoriadagen and Nationaldagen. On 31 October 2008 Perrelli was a guest judge and coach for the remaining contestants on Idol 2008. In November and December, she promoted her Christmas album and toured Sweden. In the beginning of 2009, she travelled to Beijing to perform in a series of TV shows. She worked as a judge on the Swedish show Talang 2009.

2010–present
At the Schlager pride in Stockholm in July 2009, she announced that she would release a new album in 2010; however, this was later put forward to 2012. Perrelli recorded a new single for the Swedish Royal Wedding in June 2010 together with pop singer Magnus Carlsson titled "Mitt livs gemål", which was very well received and performed throughout Sweden. In August, she released a fitness book titled Kan du Kan jag. In December 2010, she toured Swedish churches with her material from Rimfrostjul. Perrelli continued as a judge on Talang 2010 and Talang 2011. During the summer, she toured with Diggiloo once more. In November 2011, she confirmed that she would play Eva Peron in the Swedish version of the musical Evita at the Malmö Opera. As a result, she released Don't cry for me Argentina as a single.

She participated in Melodifestivalen 2012 with the entry "The Girl" by Fredrik Kempe in a bid to represent Sweden at the Eurovision Song Contest 2012 in Baku, Azerbaijan. In the fourth semi-final of the show, she came in fifth, and failed to qualify to the final. Nonetheless, she released her seventh album titled The Girl, which contained eight new tracks, including "Little Braveheart", a duet with Belgian singer Kate Ryan. Other hits include Just not tonight and No More Black & Blue. She also released her own perfume and shimmering lotion called The Girl.

In the summer of 2012, she once again toured with Diggiloo. After this, she released her second fitness book. In 2013, she released her second Christmas album titled Min barndoms jul and toured extensively in Scandinavia.

In 2015, she released the song Bröllopsvalsen which she performed at numerous events. The song is a tribute to her husband. She also released a book about pregnancy.

In 2017, she released the music album in Swedish titled Mitt liv. She also toured with Diggiloo during the summers of 2014, 2015, 2017 and 2018. In 2018, she appeared on Så mycket bättre which is broadcast on TV4. She released her autobiography in October 2018 titled Flickan från Småland and is currently touring through Sweden with a tour with the same name.

2019 saw Perrelli commentate for SVT at the Eurovision Song Contest 2019 in Israel beside Edward af Sillén, 20 years after winning the contest in the same country.

She participated in Melodifestivalen 2021 with the song ”Still Young” when she qualified for the finale, where she came 8th with 60 points.

Personal life
In 2003, Perrelli married Stockholm-based Swedish–Italian restaurateur Nicola Ingrosso, and had two sons by him. Ingrosso's first brother Emilio was married to another Swedish singer, Pernilla Wahlgren, and the couple have a son who is also a singer, Benjamin, while his second brother Vito also has a son, Sebastian, a member of Swedish House Mafia; following a disagreement with Ingrosso's family, Charlotte and Nicola decided to change their last names to Perrelli (his mother's last name).

After speculation in Swedish media that the couple were experiencing relationship issues, Perrelli and Ingrosso officially announced their separation in June 2008. On 24 September 2009, the couple filed for divorce.

Since 2012, Perrelli has been in a relationship with Anders Jensen. Perrelli gave birth to the couple's first child on 30 July 2013. In October 2018, she gave birth to her fourth child.

Discography

Albums
All studio albums and their chart positions in the Swedish Top 60 (SWE).

Singles

Soundtracks
Soundtracks containing Charlotte Perrelli songs.
2000: Livet är en schlager soundtrack – "Jag vill bara älska med dig"

Compilations
Compilations containing Charlotte Perrelli songs.
1999: Absolute '99: The Best of 1999 – "Take Me to Your Heaven"
1999: Mr Music Hits – Vol 7, 1999 – "Take Me to Your Heaven"
1999: Maximum Dance – Vol 7, 1999 – "Take Me to Your Heaven"
1999: Absolute Music 30 – "Take Me to Your Heaven"
1999: 100% Semester – Vol 4 – "Take Me to Your Heaven"
2000: Eurovision Song Contest 1956–1999 – "Take Me to Your Heaven"
2000: Barn 2000 – "Behöver Dig Nu"
2000: Schooldays – "Tusen och en Natt"
2001: Melodifestivalen 2001 – "Tusen och en Natt"
2008: Melodifestivalen 2008 – "Hero"
2012: "Melodifestivalen 2012" – "The Girl"
2015: "Very Best of Eurovision Song Contest - 60th Anniversary" – "Take Me to Your Heaven"

References

External links

1974 births
Living people
People from Lessebo Municipality
Eurovision Song Contest entrants of 1999
Eurovision Song Contest entrants of 2008
Eurovision Song Contest winners
Melodifestivalen winners
Dansband singers
Eurovision Song Contest entrants for Sweden
Swedish contraltos
Swedish songwriters
Swedish pop singers
English-language singers from Sweden
21st-century Swedish singers
21st-century Swedish women singers
Schlager musicians
Wizex members
Melodifestivalen contestants of 2021
Melodifestivalen contestants of 2017
Melodifestivalen contestants of 2012
Melodifestivalen contestants of 2008
Melodifestivalen contestants of 1999